The Juan Fernández hotspot is a volcanic hotspot located in the southeastern Pacific Ocean. The hotspot created the Juan Fernández Ridge which includes the Juan Fernández Archipelago and a long seamount chain that is being subducted in the Peru–Chile Trench at the site of Papudo giving origin to the Norte Chico Volcanic Gap.

See also
Easter hotspot
Liquiñe-Ofqui Fault
Patagonian Volcanic Gap

Volcanism of Chile
Hotspots of the Pacific Ocean
Juan Fernández Islands